The third UEFA Women's Cup took place during the 2003–04 season. It was convincingly won by reigning champions Umeå IK of Sweden in a two-legged final against 1. FFC Frankfurt of Germany. Both sides were aiming for their second win in the tournament.

First qualifying round

Group A1

Group A2

Group A3

Second qualifying round

Group B1

Group B2

Group B3

Group B4

Group B5

Group B6

Group B7

Group B8

Quarter-finals

First Leg

Second Leg

Semi-finals

First Leg

Second Leg

Final

First Leg

Second Leg

Top goalscorers

References

External links
 2003–04 season at UEFA website
 UEFA Women's Cup results at RSSSF

Women's Cup
2003-04
UEFA
UEFA